Stowell is a surname, and may refer to:

 Austin Stowell (born 1984), American actor
 Belinda Stowell (born 1971), Australian sailor
 Blake Stowell, director of corporate communications for The SCO Group
 Brian Stowell (1936–2019), Manx language activist
 Bruce Stowell (born 1941), English football player and manager
 Christopher Stowell (born 1966), American ballet dancer and choreographer
 Dennis E. Stowell (1944–2011), American politician and chemical engineer
 Ellery Cory Stowell (1875–1958), professor of international law
 Hugh Stowell (1799–1865), Church of England clergyman
 Jay Samuel Stowell (1883–1966), American Methodist author
 Joe Stowell (born 1926), American college basketball coach and broadcaster
 John Stowell (born 1950), American jazz guitarist
 John M. Stowell (1824–1907), American politician, Mayor of Milwaukee
 John Stowell (MP) (fl. 1369–1402), English merchant and Member of Parliament 
 Joseph Stowell, president of Cornerstone University and author
 Kathryn Stowell, New Zealand academic
 Louise Reed Stowell (1850–1932), American scientist, author
 Mike Stowell (born 1965), English football goalkeeper
 M. Louise Stowell (1861–1930), American painter and illustrator
 Rachel Stowell (born 1977), English football player
 Theodore Stowell (1847–1916), president of Bryant College 
 Thomas Blanchard Stowell (1846–1927), teacher, scientist
 Thomas E. A. Stowell (1885–1970), surgeon
 Thomas Stowell (1764–1821), Manx lawyer 
 Tina Stowell, Baroness Stowell of Beeston (born 1967), British Conservative politician
 Walton Danforth Stowell (1936–2009), American architect and historic preservationist
 Warren Stowell (born 1941), American businessman, teacher, and politician
 William Stowell (1885–1919), American silent film actor
 William Hendry Stowell (1800–1858), Manx nonconformist minister
 William Henry Harrison Stowell (1840–1922), American congressman, merchant and industrialist